Dirk Müller (born 18 November 1975) is a German Ford factory racing driver, driving for Ford Chip Ganassi Racing in the 2016 IMSA WeatherTech SportsCar Championship. His former Schnitzer BMW team-mate Jörg Müller is unrelated, as is French driver Yvan Muller.

Biography
Born in Burbach, Müller won a Formula 3 race at the Nürburgring in 1996. In 1998, after a win in the GT1 class of the 24 Hours of Daytona, he scored his first title, the Porsche Carrera Cup Germany, to be followed by the ALMS GT title in 2000.

From the 2002 to 2005 season, both Dirk and Jörg were driving BMW 3 Series (E46) touring cars for the Schnitzer-operated works squad Team Deutschland in the FIA European Touring Car Championship (now WTCC). Since 2006, the team uses the new BMW 3 Series (E90) which is based on the BMW 320si limited edition model that has a 4-cyl engine rather than the usual 6-cyl.

The 2004 24 Hours Nürburgring was won by both Müllers (and Hans-Joachim Stuck) with the BMW M3 GTR V8 that had been raced successfully in the 2001 ALMS. In 2005, the Müllers finished 2nd behind their sister car.

After touring cars he joined to Ferrari AF Corse with Toni Vilander and won the FIA GT Championship in GT2 class. In 2008 raced in the American Le Mans Series in Ferrari F430 GTC with Dominik Farnbacher in the GT2 class.

In 2009, Müller rejoined BMW to spearhead its factory program with Rahal Letterman Racing in the American Le Mans Series. He and Joey Hand won the 2011 American Le Mans Series GT driver's championship following wins at the Twelve Hours of Sebring, Grand Prix of Long Beach and Lime Rock Park.

Müller was entered as an international driver in the 2011 Armor All Gold Coast 600 for V8 Supercars, alongside second-generation racer Steven Johnson. The German crashed out of the first race and the pairing finished 12th in the second.

For 2016, Müller joined the Ford factory program for the IMSA Weathertech SportsCar Championship as well as the 24 Hours of Le Mans. He was reunited with teammate Joey Hand, while Sébastien Bourdais joined the team for the endurance races including Le Mans.

Racing record

24 Hours of Le Mans results

Complete World Touring Car Championship results
(key) (Races in bold indicate pole position) (Races in italics indicate fastest lap)

Complete WeatherTech SportsCar Championship results
(key) (Races in bold indicate pole position; results in italics indicate fastest lap)

External links

Dirk Müller
Profile – by FIA GT Championship official website

1975 births
Living people
People from Siegen-Wittgenstein
Sportspeople from Arnsberg (region)
German racing drivers
World Touring Car Championship drivers
24 Hours of Le Mans drivers
FIA GT Championship drivers
German Formula Three Championship drivers
American Le Mans Series drivers
Supercars Championship drivers
EFDA Nations Cup drivers
24 Hours of Daytona drivers
Racing drivers from North Rhine-Westphalia
Rolex Sports Car Series drivers
Porsche Supercup drivers
Blancpain Endurance Series drivers
WeatherTech SportsCar Championship drivers
24 Hours of Spa drivers
European Touring Car Championship drivers
Asian Le Mans Series drivers
GT World Challenge America drivers
Australian Endurance Championship drivers
Chip Ganassi Racing drivers
Schnitzer Motorsport drivers
BMW M drivers
Multimatic Motorsports drivers
Porsche Motorsports drivers
CRS Racing drivers
Abt Sportsline drivers
Dick Johnson Racing drivers
Rahal Letterman Lanigan Racing drivers
AF Corse drivers
Nürburgring 24 Hours drivers
Porsche Carrera Cup Germany drivers